Dead on Arrivals is an EP by 16volt, released on October 26, 2017 by Murder Creek.

Reception
Ilker Yücel of ReGen claimed the album successfully ushers in the band's third era and labeled Dead on Arrivals as "an aggressive return to form for 16volt, providing in six songs more punch than most bands can deliver in a full-length album."

Track listing

Personnel
Adapted from the Dead on Arrivals liner notes.

16volt
 Eric Bergen – drums
 Erik Gustafson – synthesizer, sampler
 Steve Hickey – guitar, bass guitar, drums, synthesizer, sampler, co-production
 Eric Powell – lead vocals, guitar, drums, synthesizer, sampler, production, mixing, mastering, design

Production and design
 Artemis Sere – cover art, illustrations

Release history

References

External links 
 
 Dead on Arrivals at Bandcamp
 Dead on Arrivals at Discogs (list of releases)

2017 EPs
16volt albums